USS Nokomis may refer to:

 , served the US Navy as a patrol craft during World War I
 , a tugboat in service from 1940 to 1974

United States Navy ship names